Polyakovka is a rural locality (a selo) and the administrative centre of Polyakovsky Selsoviet, Uchalinsky District, Bashkortostan, Russia. The population was 677 as of 2010. There are 11 streets.

Geography 
Polyakovka is located 46 km northeast of Uchaly (the district's administrative centre) by road. Komsomolsk is the nearest rural locality.

References 

Rural localities in Uchalinsky District